Aileen Lee (born 1970) is a U.S. venture capital angel investor and co-founder of Cowboy Ventures.

Lee coined the often-used Silicon Valley term unicorn in a TechCrunch article "Welcome To The Unicorn Club: Learning from Billion-Dollar Startups" as profiled in The New York Times. A unicorn is generally defined as a privately held startup that has a $1 billion valuation or more – something rare (like a unicorn).

Education 
Lee earned her bachelor's degree from the MIT Sloan School of Management in 1992. After MIT, she worked as a financial analyst for two years at Morgan Stanley. She earned her MBA from Harvard Business School in 1997.

Career 
Lee joined Kleiner Perkins (KPCB) in 1999 and was the founding CEO of RMG Networks, a company backed by KPCB. Lee worked at Kleiner Perkins for 13 years and left in 2012.

In 2012, she left KPCB to start seed-stage venture firm Cowboy Ventures. In 2017, Lee added Ted Wang to the firm as a general partner.

Cowboy Ventures is one of the first female-led venture capital firms. Over the past six years, Cowboy Ventures has received three large funds, the most recent reaching $95 million.

Through Cowboy Ventures, Lee has made investments in many early-stage companies, including August, Dollar Shave Club,  Textio, Accompany and Tally Technologies. She is a public advocate of increasing the number of female founders and investors in the Silicon Valley.

Philanthropy
In 2018, Lee co-founded All Raise, a nonprofit organization which seeks to increase the amount of funding that female investors receive. The organization was founded as a collective by more than 30 venture capitalists who advocate for increasing the presence of women in venture capital. Lee described the organization's importance in saying “We believe that by improving the success of women in the venture-backed tech ecosystem, we can build a more accessible community that reflects the diversity of the world around us.”

Awards and recognition
Lee was invited to speak at the 2018 Code Conference put on by Recode and additionally at the 2018 GeekWire Summit. She also spoke at the 2019 Silicon Slopes Tech Summit. and is recognized as a speaker for the organization Lesbians Who Tech and the Female Founders Conference.

Lee has appeared on Forbes''' list of The World's 100 Most Powerful Women (position #97 as of 2020) and the Midas List in 2020 (position #80), 2019 (position #82), and 2018 (position #97). She also appeared on Time's'' list of 100 Most Influential People in 2019.

Personal life 
Lee grew up in New Jersey and is the daughter of Chinese immigrants. Aileen Lee is married.

References

External links
Cowboy Ventures

Kleiner Perkins people
Living people
American venture capitalists
American women investors
American chief executives of financial services companies
American women chief executives
American women company founders
American company founders
MIT Sloan School of Management alumni
Harvard Business School alumni
Angel investors
1970 births
American people of Chinese descent
Henry Crown Fellows
21st-century American businesswomen
21st-century American businesspeople